John Pettigrew (1832 – 18 November 1878) was a politician in Queensland, Australia. He was a Member of the Queensland Legislative Assembly. and represented the Electoral District of Stanley from 20 Nov 1873 until 10 Dec 1878.

Personal life 
John Pettigrew was born in 1832 Tarshaw, Burton, Ayrshire, Scotland. His parents were Robert Pettigrew and Mary (née McWhinnie). His brother was William Pettigrew, who was a Member of the Queensland Legislative Council and mayor of Brisbane. John was educated at the Ayr Academy, Scotland and emigrated to Australia in 1850.

After initially living in Melbourne John Pettigrew moved to Ipswich, Queensland in 1852 and was one Ipswich's first general storekeepers. He was a strong supporter of Moreton Bay Colony separating from New South Wales with his being the first signature to appear on the petition to the Governor of New South Wales.

John Pettigrew was an Alderman of Ipswich City Council in 1860–61; 1863–64; and 1866. He also served as Mayor of Ipswich in 1864

In 1854, John married Elizabeth Ann Twine and they had five children before Elizabeth died in 1868. Surviving children included:
 Robert Pettigrew 1856
 Elizabeth Heys Pettigrew 1859
 Annie Mary Pettigrew 1864
 William Pettigrew 1866

In 1868 John married Grace Marcella Boyd and they had four children. Surviving children included:
 James Pettigrew 1870
 William Pettigrew 1874
 Henry Pettigrew 1877

John Pettigrew died on 18 November 1878 and is buried in the Ipswich General Cemetery

References

Members of the Queensland Legislative Assembly
1832 births
1878 deaths
Mayors of Ipswich, Queensland
People from Ipswich, Queensland
Burials at Ipswich General Cemetery
19th-century Australian politicians